Days of Gold is the fourth studio album by American country music artist Jake Owen. It was released on December 3, 2013 via RCA Nashville. The album's track listing was announced on October 9, 2013. It garnered a positive reception from critics. Days of Gold debuted at numbers 4 and 15 on both the Top Country Albums and Billboard 200 charts respectively and spawned three singles: the title track, "Beachin'", and "What We Ain't Got". Owen promoted the record by touring across North America with the Eli Young Band, Parmalee, Thomas Rhett, and The Cadillac Three as his opening acts.

Promotion

On January 7, 2014, Owen announced a 55-city North American tour to promote the album, beginning at Brookings, South Dakota and finishing at Vero Beach, Florida. He was joined by the Eli Young Band, Parmalee, Thomas Rhett, and The Cadillac Three as opening acts on select dates of his tour.

Critical reception

On review aggregator website Metacritic, Days of Gold holds a score of 71 out of 100, based on reviews from five critics, which indicates "generally favourable reviews." The album got some positive reviews from AllMusic, Country Weekly, Got Country Online and USA Today. Stephen Thomas Erlewine of AllMusic gave it a three-and-a-half out of five stars, and thought that the album had a less polished sound than its predecessor. He wrote that "There's no mistaking Days of Gold for anything earthy, but this sonic thawing winds up emphasizing Owen's inherent sweetness in an appealing fashion." At Country Weekly, Tammy Ragusa graded the album to be an A- and said that Owen's voice was "[e]ffortless and easy", and that its themes seemed like an artistic evolution from the previous album. Donna Block of Got Country Online gave it a perfect five star rating, and called this album "precious", which fans and listeners alike should own this album. At USA Today, Brian Mansfield rated it a three out of four stars, and felt that after the first three songs that the album goes south somewhat, which he noted that the hits are likely to be the "party songs"; however, he affirmed that "the others separate him from the pack."

However, the album got some mixed to unfavorable reviews from Rolling Stone, Country Standard Time and Music Is My Oxygen Weekly. At Rolling Stone, Chuck Eddy rated the release three stars out of five, and noted that the listener should "drink up" to this good album. Jeffrey B. Remz of Country Standard Time was less favorable, saying that "Owen sings well enough, although not especially distinctive on materials that is not the most exciting. Parties, relationships and drinking…are part of the mix, but frankly we've heard it all before. And that's the problem. Kenny Chesney has done these types of songs, only a lot better and with far more introspection and depth." At Music Is My Oxygen, Rob Burkhardt rated the album three out of five stars, noting the album has good material that touches on many topics which the likes of Luke Bryan, Blake Shelton and Florida Georgia Line do, and this causes it to get lost amongst the others; however, he wrote that "Days of Gold deserves to be heard, but Owen is going to have to dig a little deeper."

In 2017, Billboard contributor Chuck Dauphin placed two tracks from the album on his top 10 list of Owen's best songs: .

Track listing

Personnel
Adapted from liner notes.

Joseph Arick - harmonica
Tom Bukovac - electric guitar
Sarah Buxton - background vocals
Shannon Forrest - drums
Audley Freed - electric guitar
Wes Hightower - background vocals
Jaren Johnston - acoustic guitar
Charlie Judge - Hammond B-3 organ, piano, programming
Joey Moi - bass guitar, acoustic guitar, electric guitar, percussion, programming, synthesizer, background vocals
Jake Owen - lead vocals
Russ Pahl - pedal steel guitar
Adam Shoenfeld - electric guitar
Jimmie Lee Sloas - bass guitar
Ilya Toshinsky - banjo, dobro, acoustic guitar, baritone guitar, electric guitar, mandolin

Chart performance
Days of Gold debuted on the Billboard 200 at No. 15 and on the Top Country Albums chart at No.4, with 40,000 albums sold for the week.  The album has sold 215,400 copies in the US as of February 2015.

Weekly charts

Year-end charts

References

2013 albums
Jake Owen albums
RCA Records albums
Albums produced by Joey Moi